Holocnemus is a genus of cellar spiders that was first described by Eugène Louis Simon in 1873.

Species
, the World Spider Catalog accepts four species, found only in Africa and Europe:
H. caudatus (Dufour, 1820) – Spain, Andorra
H. hispanicus Wiehle, 1933 – Portugal, Spain
H. pluchei (Scopoli, 1763) – Europe, North Africa, Turkey, Caucasus, Middle East. Introduced to USA, Argentina, Japan, Australia
H. reini (C. Koch, 1873) – Morocco, Algeria, Tunisia

See also
 List of Pholcidae species

References

Araneomorphae genera
Spiders of Europe
Pholcidae
Spiders of North Africa